Itumbiara picticornis is a species of beetle in the family Cerambycidae. It was described by Henry Walter Bates in 1872. It is known from Costa Rica, Nicaragua and Panama.

References

picticornis
Beetles described in 1872